Grimsås is a locality situated in Tranemo Municipality, Västra Götaland County, Sweden with 721 inhabitants in 2010.

Sports
The following sports clubs are located in Grimsås:

 Grimsås IF

References 

Populated places in Västra Götaland County
Populated places in Tranemo Municipality